Manfred Mann's Cock-A-Hoop is an EP by Manfred Mann, released in 1964. The EP is a 7-inch vinyl record and released in mono with the catalogue number His Master's Voice-EMI 7EG 8848.

Track listing
Side 1
 "5-4-3-2-1" (Jones, Hugg, Mann)
 "Cock-a-Hoop" (Jones)

Side 2
 "Without You" (Jones)
 "Why Should We Not" (Mann)

Background
Manfred Mann's first EP featured their first two singles Why Should We Not and Cock-a-Hoop, released in July and October 1963.  Neither of them charted. 5-4-3-2-1 was written as the theme song for the TV show Ready Steady Go and in February 1964 reached # 5 on the British charts.

Chart performance
The EP did not chart.

Personnel
 Manfred Mann - keyboards
 Mike Vickers - guitar, alto saxophone, flute
 Mike Hugg - drums and vibes
 Paul Jones - lead vocals, harmonica
 Tom McGuinness - bass guitar on "5-4-3-2-1" and "Without You"
 Dave Richmond - bass guitar on "Why Should We Not" and "Cock-a-Hoop"

References

 liner notes
Footnotes

1964 EPs
EMI Records EPs
Manfred Mann EPs
His Master's Voice EPs